Nii Kwaku Sowah is a Ghanaian Government Official and Chairman of the National Pensions Regulatory Authority

References

Living people
National Democratic Congress (Ghana) politicians
Ghanaian civil servants
Year of birth missing (living people)